Jenae Zillgitt Seppälä (née Gibbens; born January 13, 1986) is an American soccer defender who played for PK-35 Vantaa in Finland's Naisten Liiga (renamed Kansallinen Liiga in 2020) and the UEFA Women's Champions League. She was a two time Finnish Champion with PK-35 Vantaa. Seppälä's college career was played with the San Diego State Aztecs and the Fullerton Titans.

References

External links
 
 

Living people
1986 births
American women's soccer players
Expatriate women's footballers in Finland
PK-35 Vantaa (women) players
Kansallinen Liiga players
Cal State Fullerton Titans women's soccer players
American expatriate women's soccer players
American expatriate sportspeople in Finland
Expatriate footballers in Finland
Women's association football defenders